William González may refer to:

 William González (fencer)
 William González (footballer)
 William Elliott Gonzales, United States ambassador